V Empire or Dark Faerytales in Phallustein is an EP by English extreme metal band Cradle of Filth, and the first release following their 1994 debut studio album The Principle of Evil Made Flesh. It was released on 22 April 1996, and was the band's final release for Cacophonous Records.

Recording 

V Empire was hastily written and recorded for Cacophonous Records as a contractual obligation before the band jumped ship to Music for Nations. As such, it is the first of two albums released in 1996, the other being Dusk... and Her Embrace. Half of the band was replaced for this recording, with Stuart Anstis replacing guitarists Paul Allender and Paul Ryan and Damien Gregori replacing keyboardist Benjamin Ryan. All the guitars on V Empire were performed by Anstis. The name "Jared Demeter" listed as a second guitarist in the liner notes included in the booklet of the EP is just a made-up name to give the impression that there were two guitarists on the EP. Also, all keyboard duties on V Empire were handled by Keith Appleton. V Empire is the first recording to feature backing vocalist Sarah Jezebel Deva.

Content 

V Empire sees a step up in production from the band's debut and introduces the fast, highly technical instrumentation that would be the hallmark of the band's next few releases. It includes a re-recorded version of "The Forest Whispers My Name" from the band's first album, The Principle of Evil Made Flesh.

Title 

The Gospel of Filth, a definitive history of the band and its influences, written by Gavin Baddeley and Dani Filth and published in 2010, refers to this record throughout as V Empire. Due to the typographic sizing and spacing of the record's cover art, however, it has been widely read as Vempire in the years since its release. References like AllMusic and Discogs continue to retain the latter spelling, while some recent interviews appear to indicate that the band also pronounce it "Vempire" in conversation.

Release 

V Empire or Dark Faerytales in Phallustein was released on 22 April 1996. 
It was reissued in 2012 by record label The End.

Track listing
Notes:

"The Forest Whispers My Name" was re-recorded for this disc and is different from its original version on "The Principle of Evil Made Flesh".
"Queen Of Winter, Throned" repeats some elements from "A Dream of Wolves in the Snow".

Personnel 
All information from the EP booklet.

Cradle of Filth
 Dani Filth – lead vocals, lyrics
 Stuart Anstis – guitars
 Robin Graves – bass
 Damien Gregori – keyboards
 Nicholas Barker – drums

Additional musicians
 Sarah Jezebel Deva – backing vocals
 Danielle Cneajna Cottington – backing vocals
 Rachel – backing vocals

Production
 Chris Bell – artwork
 Nigel Wingrove – art direction
 Frater Nihil – photography
 Mags – producer
 Keith Appleton – engineering
 Nilesh – mastering
 Eileen – succubi model
 Vida – succubi model
 Scarlet – succubi model
 Luna – succubi model
 Gabrielle – succubi model

References

External links 

 

Cradle of Filth albums
1996 EPs
Death metal EPs
Cacophonous Records albums